Ciudad Vieja (Old City) is a historic neighbourhood in Montevideo, the capital of Uruguay. Located in a peninsula at the entrance of the natural port of Montevideo it was founded in 1724 as a walled city by the Spanish Empire, after the independence of Uruguay the city rapidly grew outwards and the Ciudad Vieja remained as one of the central neighbourhoods, nowadays it serves as one of the main office districts of Montevideo, housing multiple banks and institutions, but also as one of main tourist attractions in Uruguay due to its historical significance and classical architecture.

History 

Until 1829 it was surrounded by a wall that protected it from possible invasions. After the wall was torn down, the only part of it that was preserved was the main gateway to the Citadel, which remains to this day as an emblem of Montevideo. Some street names recall the presence of the wall, like Ciudadela (citadel) or Brecha (breach), which owns its name to the breach in the wall that the British managed to open to enter the city during the  1807 British invasion and brief occupation of the city before they were defeated.

Present 
The main street, Sarandí, was turned into a pedestrian walkway in 1992, which increased its commercial and tourist attractiveness. In 2005 it was extended to beyond the Constitution Square.

Ciudad Vieja has elegant buildings from the colonial era and the first decades of independence. The Cabildo (built between 1804 and 1812), the Solís Theatre, the Metropolitan Cathedral and several museums, like the Museo Torres García are among the most impressive ones. Also several design shops and recycled loft floors flourish in the streets near the port.

Important buildings 

 Bolsa de Valores de Montevideo
Cabildo de Montevideo 
Mercado del Puerto 
Palacio Taranco 
Central Bank of Uruguay 
Solís Theatre 
Cathedral of the Immaculate Conception, St. Philip and St. James (head of the Roman Catholic Church in Uruguay) 
 Parish Church of St. Francis of Assisi (Roman Catholic)
 Church of Our Lady of Lourdes and St. Vincent Pallotti (Roman Catholic, Pallottines)
 Cathedral of The Most Holy Trinity, popularly known as the English Temple (Anglican)
 Sephardic Jewish Community (Synagogue)

Gallery

See also 

 Montevideo
 Colonia del Sacramento
 Barrios of Montevideo

References

Bibliography

External links 

 Intendencia de Montevideo / Historia de la Ciudad Vieja
 Fotos of Ciudad Vieja
 History of Barrio Guruyú

 
Barrios of Montevideo
Entertainment districts